The Delanco Township School District is a community public school district that serves students in kindergarten through eighth grade from Delanco Township, in Burlington County, New Jersey, United States.

As of the 2021–22 school year, the district, comprised of two schools, had an enrollment of 384 students and 27.4 classroom teachers (on an FTE basis), for a student–teacher ratio of 14.0:1.

The district is classified by the New Jersey Department of Education as being in District Factor Group "CD", the sixth-highest of eight groupings. District Factor Groups organize districts statewide to allow comparison by common socioeconomic characteristics of the local districts. From lowest socioeconomic status to highest, the categories are A, B, CD, DE, FG, GH, I and J.

For ninth through twelfth grades, public school students attend Riverside High School in Riverside Township as part of a sending/receiving relationship with the Riverside School District. As of the 2021–22 school year, the high school had an enrollment of 428 students and 36.8 classroom teachers (on an FTE basis), for a student–teacher ratio of 11.6:1.

Schools
Schools in the district (with 2021–22 enrollment data from the New Jersey Department of Education) are:
Elementary school
M. Joan Pearson Elementary School with 218 students in grades K-5
Robert Pupchik, Principal
Middle school
Walnut Street Middle School with 140 students in grades 6-8
Barry Saide, Principal

Administration
Core members of the district's administration are:
Joseph Mersinger, Superintendent
Stephen Burns, Business Administrator / Board Secretary

Board of education
The district's board of education, comprised of nine members, sets policy and oversees the fiscal and educational operation of the district through its administration. As a Type II school district, the board's trustees are elected directly by voters to serve three-year terms of office on a staggered basis, with three seats up for election each year held (since 2012) as part of the November general election. The board appoints a superintendent to oversee the district's day-to-day operations and a business administrator to supervise the business functions of the district. The president of the board is Eric Mossop.

References

External links
Delanco Township School District
 
School Data for the Delanco Township School District, National Center for Education Statistics

Delanco Township, New Jersey
New Jersey District Factor Group CD
School districts in Burlington County, New Jersey